SSDO can mean:

 screen space directional occlusion
 the former ICAO code for Dourados Airport
 in biology, the SSDO-clade